Football 7-a-side at the 2016 Summer Paralympics was held in Rio de Janeiro at the Deodoro Olympic Park, from 8 September to 16 September. Football 7-a-side is played by athletes with cerebral palsy, a condition characterized by impairment of muscular coordination, stroke, or traumatic brain injury (TBI). 112 footballers are expected to compete for one set of medals.

For these games, the men compete in an 8-team tournament.

Medalists

Qualifying

Eight teams will contest the competition, which is for male athletes only.
An NPC can enter a single squad, consisting of fourteen players, two more per team than in 2012.

Qualification is by a series of tournaments, and was one of the first events for which entries were completed.

Squads

Tournament

Group A

Group B

Knockout stage

Classification round

7th–8th place match

5th–6th place match

Medal round

Semi finals

Bronze-medal match

Gold-medal match

Final rankings

Source: Paralympic.org

See also
Football 5-a-side at the 2016 Summer Paralympics
Football at the 2016 Summer Olympics

References

External links
Cerebral Palsy International Sports & Recreation Association (CPISRA)

 
2016
2016 Summer Paralympics events
2016

Paralympics